And Distrust It, released in 1995, was the debut album by Emm Gryner. It was released independently, and is no longer widely available. The last copies available through CD Baby were listed at a sale price of $45 each; CD Baby now lists the album as permanently out of stock.

Track listing

 "Higher"
 "David"
 "Strange Heaven"
 "The Winter"
 "Five Days"
 "Coming To Me"
 "Trike"
 "Lay Back"
 "Safety in Solitude"

External links
 And Distrust It at CD Baby

1995 debut albums
Emm Gryner albums